Ghorghushti ( غورغشتى) is a town of Chhachh in Attock District and is on the border of North-West Punjab (Pakistan), and Hazara in Khyber Pakhtunkhwa province.

Geography and climate
Ghorghushti lies about 4 kilometres east-north-east of Nartopa, and 6 km southwest of Qazipur, 7 km east-north-east of Hazro, and about 58 km west-north-west of Islamabad. Towns of the same name also exist in the FATA area, Swabi District and in Bunner.

Ghorghushti is the northernmost town in Attock District and in the north it borders Haripur District, in the south it borders Malak Mala village, in the west it borders Jalalia village and in the east it borders Kotkay village.

It is located at 33° 56' 41N latitude and 72° 33' 7E longitude. It has an altitude of 317 metres (1043 ft). The average annual rainfall in the district is 783 mm (30.83 inches).

References

Cities and towns in Attock District